Ascension of Christ is a c.1496-1500 painting by Pietro Perugino, now in the musée des Beaux-Arts de Lyon. It was the prototype for his Sansepolcro Altarpiece.

References

1490s paintings
Paintings in the collection of the Museum of Fine Arts of Lyon
Paintings by Pietro Perugino
Perugino
Angels in art
Musical instruments in art